By the Sword is the name of a 1991 fantasy novel by Mercedes Lackey. This is a stand-alone novel which connects the Vows & Honor series to the Valdemar Saga; it introduces the character Kerowyn and fills in what had been some gaps in the series.

Plot synopsis 
The teenage daughter of a minor nobleman, Kerowyn has been in charge of managing her father's household since her mother's death, but hates the life of a noblewoman. She is more than ready to hand the responsibilities of the household over to her younger brother's new wife; however, the keep is attacked during the wedding feast and the bride, Dierna, is kidnapped. With her father dead and her brother badly wounded, Kerowyn goes to her grandmother, the sorceress Kethryveris, for help. Kethry presents Kerowyn with her magical sword Need, and Kerowyn rides after the bandits herself, successfully rescuing Dierna in an event later immortalized in a song called "Kerowyn's Ride".

Following the rescue, Kerowyn finds that she is both a hero and an embarrassment to her brother. She soon leaves to live with Kethry and her partner Tarma, becoming Tarma's student in the arts of warfare, and learning to control her mind-magic from Tarma's kyree companion Warrl. In the course of her training Kerowyn meets Darenthallis, third son of the king of Rethwellan and another of Tarma's students; after a period of mutual antagonism, the two of them eventually become friends, and then lovers, but when Daren's father dies and his older brother takes the throne, Kerowyn refuses to go with him to Rethwellan. Instead, upon completing her training with Tarma, Kerowyn joins the mercenary company known as the Skybolts.

Kerowyn remains with the Skybolts for several years, growing in skill and in standing within the company. During a campaign against Karse, Kerowyn ends up separated from the rest of the company and flees into Karse. There, she encounters a group of Karsites who have captured and are planning to torture the Herald Eldan; securing Eldan's promise to pay her for it, she rescues him from the Karsites. The two quickly fall in love, but when Kerowyn realizes that the Karsites are tracking Need's presence, she sneaks away in the night, drawing the Karsites away and leaving Eldan to make his way back to Valdemar while she returns to the Skybolts. Upon her return, after a confrontation with the Skybolt's selfish captain, Kerowyn is made Captain of the Skybolts.

Ten years pass. The Skybolts are a formidable company under Kerowyn, and they win a decisive battle for Rethwellan against Karse. Kerowyn again meets Daren, who takes her to the Rethwellan court. While Kerowyn is at the court, Herald Talia and Herald Dirk arrive, seeking aid from Rethwellan. Prince Ancar of Hardorn is making war against Valdemar, using men controlled by magic as soldiers. Valdemar has no experience with magic, and more importantly, they do not have a large enough army. Kerowyn volunteers the Skybolts as an advance force, while Rethwellan promises a second force with Daren to follow.

In Valdemar, Kerowyn is reunited with Eldan, whom she has been unable to forget. But Ancar's forces seem limitless, and Kerowyn was unable to bring her own mages across the Valdemar border. The Skybolts sympathize with Valdemar, however, and the forces prepare for a final stand. As the battle joins, Daren arrives with the Rethwellan army and a number of Ancar's soldiers, now freed from the controlling spell. Ancar's troops are defeated, and both Kerowyn and Daren are Chosen by Companions in the chaos of the battle, making them Heralds. The Skybolts are given a border town in Valdemar to use as a home base, in gratitude for their assistance, and Kerowyn is able to remain in Valdemar, fulfilling her duties as both a Captain and a Herald.

1991 American novels
American fantasy novels
Valdemar Universe